Harun Erbek (born 8 June 1986) is a Turkish-Austrian football midfielder who plays for FC Wolfurt.

Club career
Erbek came through the youth system at FC Lustenau 1907, he officially joined the club on 1 July 2005 and joined SV Ried on 7 June 2007, where he only made one appearance before moving to the Turkish League to Kayserispor in 2008. He left in January 2009 the Turkish side Kayserispor and signed with FC Magna.

International

He has been called up to the Austria UEFA European Under-21 Championship Qualifying Squad, where he has seven caps and one goal.

Personal

His brother Ibrahim plays for FC Lustenau 07.

References

External links

 

Turkish footballers
Austrian footballers
Austrian people of Turkish descent
1986 births
SV Ried players
Kayserispor footballers
Living people
FC Lustenau players
SC Rheindorf Altach players
SV Horn players
Association football midfielders
People from Bregenz
Footballers from Vorarlberg